James Frew might refer to:

James Frew, founder of Frewville, South Australia
Jimmy Frew (footballer, born 1892), Scottish footballer
Jimmy Frew (footballer, born 1895) (1895–1985), Scottish footballer